Kyun Taw A Mone Sone Kyun Taw is a 2020 Burmese drama television series. It is based on the popular novel "Kyun Taw A Mone Sone Kyun Taw" written by Le Dwin Thar Saw Chit. It aired on MRTV-4, from February 13 to March 11, 2020, at 20:45 for 26 episodes.

Cast

Main
Nat Khat as Soe Naing
Nan Sandar Hla Htun as Aye Phyu, wife of Soe Naing
 Nay Yee Win Lai as Yinn Mar
 Kaung Myat as Ko Thaung Myint
 Zwe Wai Yan Htoo (child actor) as Mg Pyone, son of Soe Naing

Supporting
 Thar Htet Nyan Zaw as Myat Thit
 Su Sandi Yoon as Hnin Wai
 Kaung Set Naing as Ko Ko Naing, elder brother of Yinn Mar
Zin Wine as father of Yinn Mar
 Than Than Soe as mother of Aye Phyu
 Khin Moht Moht Aye as mother of Soe Naing
 Min Khant as Htun Htun, younger brother of Soe Naing

References

Burmese television series
MRTV (TV network) original programming